The 2007 Speedway World Cup Race-off was the third race of the 2007 Speedway World Cup season. It took place on July 19, 2007 in the Alfred Smoczyk Stadium in Leszno, Poland.

Results

Heat details

Heat after heat 
 Sullivan, Davidsson, Gollob, Gizatulin
 Baliński, Holder, D.Iwanow, Jonsson
 Adams, Hampel, Sajfutdinow, Max
 R.Iwanow, Lindgren, Schlein, Walasek
 Crump, Karlsson, Kasprzak, Gafurow
 Lindgren, Crump, Hampel, Gizatulin
 Karlsson, Walasek, Sullivan, D.Iwanow
 Holder, Davidsson, Kasprzak, Sajfutdinow
 Adams, Gollob, Jonsson, R.Iwanow
 Max, Baliński, Schlein, Gafurow
 Walasek, Max, Holder, Gizatulin
 Kasprzak, Lindgren, Adams, D.Iwanow
 Gollob, Karlsson, Schlein, Sajfutdinow
 Crump, Baliński, Davidsson, R.Iwanow
 Hampel, Sullivan, Jonsson, Gafurow
 Adams, Baliński, Karlsson, Gizatulin(e4)
 Hampel, Davidsson, Schlein, D.Iwanow
 Crump, Walasek, Jonsson, Sajfutdinow
 Sullivan, Kasprzak, R.Iwanow, Max
 Gollob, Lindgren(joker), Holder, Gafurow
 Kasprzak, Schlein, Davidsson, Gizatulin(e4)
 Crump, Gollob, D.Iwanow, Max
 Sullivan, Lindgren, Baliński, Sajfutdinow
 Hampel, Karlsson, Holder, R.Iwanow(joker)
 Adams, Walasek, Davidsson, Gafurow

References

See also 
 2007 Speedway World Cup
 motorcycle speedway

R